Hvistendahl is a surname. Notable people with the surname include:

Finn Hvistendahl (born 1942), Norwegian businessman
Mara Hvistendahl, American writer